Martin V. Pratt was a member of the Wisconsin State Assembly.

Biography
Pratt was born on November 10, 1828 in Easton, Massachusetts. He graduated from what is now Bridgewater State University. In 1869, Pratt married Evaline E. Holmes. They would have a daughter. Pratt died in 1898.

Career
Pratt was a member of the Assembly during the 1881 and 1889 sessions. Other positions he held include President (similar to Mayor) of Evansville, Wisconsin. He was a Republican.

References

People from Easton, Massachusetts
People from Walworth County, Wisconsin
People from Evansville, Wisconsin
Republican Party members of the Wisconsin State Assembly
Mayors of places in Wisconsin
Bridgewater State University alumni
1828 births
1898 deaths
19th-century American politicians